Anthony family may refer to:

 Anthony family (Susan B. Anthony), American Quaker family, whose most notable member is Susan B. Anthony
 Anthony family (Australian politics), Australian family notable for work in politics